William Crowell may refer to:

 William P. Crowell (born 1940), Deputy Director of the National Security Agency, 1994–1997
 William C. Crowell (1871–1951), American architect and builder